QIT-Fer et Titane (QIT from its old name "Quebec Iron and Titanium") is a Canadian mining company located in Quebec.  The company operates an ilmenite (titanium oxide ore) mine at Lake Tio in northern Quebec, and in southern Quebec operates refining facilities that produce titanium dioxide, pig iron, steel, and other metal products.  The company is a wholly owned subsidiary of mining giant Rio Tinto Group.

QIT operates a  railway line, the Chemin de fer de la Rivière Romaine, from its  mine to the port of Havre-Saint-Pierre on the St. Lawrence River. The line carries mined ore as well as passenger trains for workers and serves as the only access route to the mine.

Stakes
80 % in QIT Madagascar Minerals

References

Rio Tinto (corporation) subsidiaries
Mining companies of Canada
Titanium mining